Ichthyodes truncata is a species of beetle in the family Cerambycidae. It was described by Per Olof Christopher Aurivillius in 1917.

References

Ichthyodes
Beetles described in 1917